USS Spitfire may refer to the following ships of the United States Navy:
 , a gunboat on Lake Champlain.
 , a Rhode Island galley captured by the British in 1778 during the Mount Hope Bay raids.
 , a merchant sloop operated until 1820.
 , a ship operated until 1816.
 , a sidewheel gunboat operated until 1848; used during the Mexican–American War
 , a tugboat that was renamed Spitfire when operated by Union forces on the Mississippi River during the American Civil War
 , a temporary name of Casco-class monitor USS Suncook while laid up in 1869

United States Navy ship names